Golisano Children's Hospital can refer to three different unaffiliated children's hospitals in the United States.

 Golisano Children's Hospital (Rochester, NY)
 Upstate Golisano Children's Hospital (Syracuse, NY)
 Golisano Children's Hospital of Southwest Florida

Children's hospitals in the United States